Michael Noonan (born 21 May 1943) is an Irish former Fine Gael politician who served as Minister for Finance from 2011 to 2017, Leader of the Opposition and Leader of Fine Gael from 2001 to 2002, Minister for Health from 1994 to 1997, Minister for Industry and Commerce from 1986 to 1987, Minister for Energy from January 1987 to March 1987 and Minister for Justice from 1982 to 1986. He served as a Teachta Dála (TD) from 1981 to 2020.

Noonan had been a member of every Fine Gael cabinet since 1982, serving in the cabinets of Garret FitzGerald, John Bruton and Enda Kenny. During these terms of office he held the positions of Justice, Energy, Industry and Commerce, Health and Finance. When Fine Gael lost power after the 1997 general election, Noonan remained an important figure in the party when he became Opposition Spokesperson for Finance.

He succeeded John Bruton as Leader of Fine Gael and Leader of the Opposition in 2001, however, he resigned following Fine Gael's disastrous showing at the 2002 general election. After eight years as a backbencher, during which time he served as Chairman of the Public Accounts Committee, Fine Gael leader Enda Kenny appointed Noonan to his front bench in 2010, to his former portfolio of Spokesperson for Finance.

Early life
The son of a local school teacher, Noonan was born in Limerick in 1943, but raised in Loughill, County Limerick. He was educated at the local National School and St. Patrick's Secondary School in Glin, before studying to be a primary school teacher at St. Patrick's College, Drumcondra, Dublin. He subsequently completed a BA and H.Dip. in English and Economics at University College Dublin. He began to work as a secondary school teacher in Dublin. Noonan developed an interest in politics from his mother, whose family had been heavily involved in Fine Gael at local level in Limerick, and joined the Dublin branch of the party after graduating from university. He returned to Limerick in the late 1960s, where he took up a teaching post at Crescent College. Here he continued his involvement in politics, canvassing for the Fine Gael candidate, James O'Higgins, in the Limerick East by-election in 1968, caused by the death of Donogh O'Malley.

Political career

Early years: 1974–1982
Having been involved in the local Fine Gael organisation in Limerick since the late 1960s, Noonan first held political office in 1974, when he was elected as a member of Limerick County Council. Having built up a local profile he contested the 1981 general election for the party and secured a seat in Limerick East. Upon taking his Dáil seat, Noonan became a full-time politician, giving up his teaching post and resigning his seat on Limerick County Council. Though Fine Gael formed a coalition government with the Labour Party, Noonan, as a first time TD, remained on the backbenches.

Cabinet minister: 1982–1987
Fine Gael lost power following the first general election in early 1982, however, Noonan subsequently joined the party's new front bench as Spokesperson for Education. A second general election in late 1982 following the collapse of the Fianna Fáil government, saw another Fine Gael-Labour Party coalition come to power. Just eighteen months after entering the Dáil, Noonan was appointed to the highly sensitive position of Minister for Justice. After a few weeks in office he revealed the illegal phone-tapping of journalists' phones, carried out by the previous Fianna Fáil administration that preceded it in power. That government had authorised illegal phone tapping of the journalists Geraldine Kennedy, Bruce Arnold and Vincent Browne. Seán Doherty signed warrants for the taps while serving as Minister for Justice. Noonan introduced a new Criminal Justice Bill while also bringing in reforms in the Garda Síochána, the courts and the prison service and the facing down of a difficult prison officers' dispute. He also dealt with the wording of the controversial abortion referendum in 1983. Noonan, however, also presided over the justice ministry when inmates in an overcrowded and understaffed Spike Island prison set fire to the building.

A cabinet reshuffle in 1986, saw Noonan demoted to the position of Minister for Industry and Commerce. Following the withdrawal of the Labour Party from government in 1987, Noonan also briefly took office as Minister for Energy.

Opposition: 1987–1994
Fine Gael lost power following the 1987 general election and were confined to the opposition benches. The new Fine Gael leader, Alan Dukes, appointed Noonan to the senior position of front bench Spokesperson for Finance and the Public Service. The party did poorly under Dukes and he was replaced by John Bruton in 1990. Noonan was retained on the new front bench, however, he was demoted to the position of Spokesperson for Transport, Energy and Communications. In 1991, he returned to local politics as a member of Limerick County Council, serving again until 1994. Noonan's period in opposition often saw him at odds with his party leader. Not long after his demotion as Spokesperson for Finance, he announced that he would be taking "positions of leadership" on a wide range of important issues. This was seen as a veiled threat to John Bruton's leadership, with Noonan positioning himself as an alternative party leader. In 1994, a number of Fine Gael TDs attempted to oust Bruton as party leader following poor showings in opinion polls. Noonan aligned himself with the rebels and stated that he would stand for the leadership should Bruton be defeated. The latter survived as leader and Noonan resigned from the front bench.

Minister for Health: 1994–1997
In 1994, the 'Rainbow Coalition' was formed and Noonan became Minister for Health. The Department of Health was embroiled in a scandal at the time regarding blood products contaminated with Hepatitis C virus, caused by the negligence of the Blood Transfusion Service Board. Noonan consistently held an authoritarian line on the case of Brigid McCole and would not budge on his views, suffering as a result of the scandal. He threatened to take Bridget's mother Ellen to the Supreme Court, when she wondered why her daughter had contracted the disease. Noonan was forced to establish the Hepatitis C Tribunal of Inquiry and to issue several apologies for his handling of the affair. Noonan remained as Minister for Health until the 1997 general election. The Irish Times said "the woman involved had been infected by a negligent State agency, in the biggest health scandal since its foundation." When RTÉ broadcast a drama, No Tears, on Noonan's treatment of Bridget McCole, Justine McCarthy wrote in the Irish Independent that Noonan "compounded the perception of a heartless pedant by whingeing about the way he was depicted in the drama's final episode, broadcast on the same night that he declined to appear on Questions & Answers and when it was reported that yet another woman who was infected by the State had died from the illness."

His home was picketed by anti-abortion campaign group Youth Defence.

Return to Opposition: 1997–2011

Leader of Fine Gael: 2001–2002
Despite increasing their seats to 54, Fine Gael returned to opposition and Noonan became Opposition Spokesman for Finance following the 1997 general election. In 2001, following a series of disastrous opinion polls, Noonan and his colleague, Jim Mitchell, tabled a motion of no confidence in the leader, John Bruton. The motion was successful in ousting Bruton as leader, with Noonan becoming leader of Fine Gael and Leader of the Opposition with Mitchell becoming deputy leader. Noonan avoided requests to be interviewed on TV and radio programmes, including some on RTÉ and Today FM, ahead of the leadership election.

At the 2002 general election, Fine Gael had a disastrous result, dropping from 54 seats to 31 and a number of high-profile front bench member losses, including Alan Dukes, Deirdre Clune, Alan Shatter and deputy leader Jim Mitchell. Noonan resigned as Fine Gael leader on the night of the election.

TD: 2002–2011
He was replaced by Enda Kenny, the runner-up to Noonan in the 2001 leadership election. However, Noonan remained as a TD, and was re-elected at the 2007 general election, and went on to serve on Kenny's Front bench. He was vice-chairperson of the Joint Oireachtas Committee on Constitutional Amendment and Children.

Minister for Finance: 2011–2017
In July 2010, Noonan was promoted to the Fine Gael Front Bench as Spokesperson for Finance. In an August 2010 interview with the Sunday Independent, Noonan said he hoped to become Minister for Finance. 
At the 2011 general election, he was re-elected as a TD for Limerick City, receiving 13,291 (30.8% 1st preference) votes. On 9 March 2011, he was appointed Minister for Finance by Taoiseach Enda Kenny.

In March 2011, the International Monetary Fund (IMF) and the European Union (EU) backed the proposed programme for government and gave the coalition the green light to make changes to the terms of the multibillion-euro bailout. After meeting officials from the IMF – including Ireland mission head Ajai Chopra – European Central Bank (ECB) and European Commission (EC), Noonan said it was agreed the terms of the rescue deal would be altered, as long as the financial targets remain the same. "What was being discussed in general terms was our proposal that the conditions and the memorandum of understanding would be changed for alternative conditions which are in the programme for government," Noonan said.

In July 2011, Noonan speaking after an EU summit on 21 July said that the new deal agreed with euro zone leaders means a second bailout for Ireland is "off the table". The deal will see a reduction in the interest rate on bailout loans to Greece, Ireland, Portugal and Italy. This followed a 10-hour emergency summit at which eurozone leaders agreed to provide a second international bailout worth €109 billion to Greece. The plan will be funded by eurozone countries, the proceeds of privatisations and the anticipated €12.6 billion benefit of a debt buyback programme. Noonan said a provision in the agreement meant Ireland would not have to go back to markets when the programme ended if the country had not reached its deficit target. "There's a commitment that if countries continue to fulfil the conditions of their programme, the European authorities will continue to supply them with money even when the programme concludes," he said. There would be "little or no easing" of budgetary conditions for this year, but there could be more positive implications in later years. "I'm afraid we still have to face the music in December," he said.

In November 2011, he said the payment of more than €700 million to Anglo Irish Bank bondholders was "the lesser of two evils". On 16 May 2012, Noonan caused controversy with his Greek "holidays" and "feta cheese" comment at a breakfast briefing with Bloomberg news agency. Noonan said these were the only links between Ireland and Greece. He attended the 2012 Bilderberg Conference in his capacity of Minister for Finance at Chantilly, Virginia, from 31 May-3 June 2012. On 5 December 2012, he delivered his second budget as Minister for Finance, which included a new property tax to be introduced in 2013.

In February 2013, a deal was reached with the European Central Bank (ECB) in relation to the promissory note used to bail out the former Anglo Irish Bank. Noonan said that the government had achieved its objectives in the negotiations with the ECB, and that the arrangement meant that there would be €1bn less taken from them in terms of taxes and spending cuts up to 2015. Noonan said that the government did not ask for a write down on the Anglo Irish debt during negotiations with the ECB as "the ECB does not do write downs".
On 15 October 2013, he delivered the budget for 2014.

Following improvements in Ireland's unemployment rate and outlook for growth, the securing of the February 2013 Anglo Irish Bank promissory note deal with the European Central Bank, and Ireland's exit from the EU/IMF/ECB bailout programme and successful return to the bond markets, Noonan was named Europe's best Finance Minister for the previous year in January 2014 by the Financial Times-owned magazine The Banker.

When the European Central Bank raised the limit on the amount of emergency liquidity assistance (ELA) available to Greek banks by about €2 billion at the height of the country's government-debt crisis in June 2015, Noonan joined his German counterpart Wolfgang Schäuble in arguing forcefully for limits on the amount of ELA approved by the central bank unless capital controls were introduced.

In July 2016, the Central Statistics Office announced 2015 Irish GDP growth of 26.3% and Irish GNP growth of 18.7%. The growth became known internationally by the pejorative term, leprechaun economics. Noonan attributed the figures to multinational restructuring following the closure of the double Irish tax scheme, however they were subsequently attributed to Apple in 2018 (widely suspected in 2016). Noonan came to the defense of Apple when the European Commission announced in August 2016 that it had found against Apple in its investigation of illegal State aid. Noonan led the rejection of any claim by Ireland to the EU Commission's €13 billion fine on Apple, calling it an "attack" by the commission, and was supported by the main opposition party. In October 2016, Noonan introduced changes in the 2016 Finance Act to curb tax abuses of section 110 special purpose vehicles, (securitisation vehicles for IFSC firms), by US distressed debt funds in Ireland (pejoratively called vulture funds in the Irish media). Investigations into these abuses by the financial media, showed the scale and rapid gains these funds were making from NAMA's disposal program, and that these gains were free of Irish taxes. It led to some revision as to whether Noonan had been too quick in selling State assets to distressed debt funds, and had given overly generous tax benefits and incentives.

Retirement
In May 2017, he announced he would be stepping down as Minister for Finance in the coming weeks when a new Taoiseach was appointed, and as a member of the Dáil at the next general election.

Personal life
Noonan married Florence Knightley, a native of Castlemaine, County Kerry and a primary school teacher, in 1969. They had three sons: Tim, John and Michael, and two daughters: Orla and Deirdre. In May 2010, Noonan appeared on RTÉ's The Frontline to talk about his wife's battle with Alzheimer's disease. Florence Noonan died on 23 February 2012 of pneumonia.

See also

EU illegal State aid case against Apple in Ireland

References

External links
Michael Noonan's page on the Fine Gael website
Michael Noonan's file at Limerick City Library, Ireland

|-

|-

|-

|-

|-

|-

|-

|-

 
1943 births
Alumni of St Patrick's College, Dublin
Alumni of University College Dublin
Fine Gael TDs
Irish schoolteachers
Leaders of Fine Gael
Living people
Local councillors in County Limerick
Members of the 22nd Dáil
Members of the 23rd Dáil
Members of the 24th Dáil
Members of the 25th Dáil
Members of the 26th Dáil
Members of the 27th Dáil
Members of the 28th Dáil
Members of the 29th Dáil
Members of the 30th Dáil
Members of the 31st Dáil
Members of the 32nd Dáil
Ministers for Finance (Ireland)
Ministers for Health (Ireland)
Politicians from County Limerick
Post-2008 Irish economic downturn
Ministers for Enterprise, Trade and Employment